Daniel Bennett St. John Roosa (1838–1908) was an American physician born in Bethel, New York.

He graduated in 1860 from New York's University Medical College. He was assistant surgeon in the Fifth New York Volunteers' three-months troops, became resident surgeon at the New York Hospital in 1862, and in 1864 began practice in New York City.

He was one of the founders of Manhattan Eye, Ear and Throat Hospital. From 1863 to 1882, he was a professor of diseases of the eye and ear at his alma mater, and from 1875 to 1880 held a similar chair at the University of Vermont (Burlington). In 1888, he was appointed professor of diseases of the eye in the New York Post-Graduate Medical School, of whose faculty he would become president.

Publications
He wrote: 
 A practical Treatise on the Diseases of the Ear (1873; sixth edition, 1885)
 The Determination of the Necessity for Wearing Glasses (1887) 
 Handbook of the Anatomy and Diseases of the Eye and Ear (1904), with A. E. Davis 
 Textbook of the Diseases of the Ear, Nose, and Pharynx (1905), with B. Douglass

Notes

References

1838 births
1908 deaths
NewYork–Presbyterian Hospital physicians
Union Army surgeons
American otolaryngologists
American science writers
Physicians from New York City
People from Burlington, Vermont
People from Bethel, New York
American ophthalmologists
University of Vermont faculty
New York University faculty